Anti-fascist research group Kafka is a Dutch anti-fascist and far-left research group. Its name is originally an acronym for Kollektief Anti-Fascistisch/-Kapitalistisch Archief.

Background
The research group finds its origins in the squatters' movement. It conducts research into groups and individuals in the Netherlands whom it considers to be far-right, and the developments related to them. The results are published on Kafka's website and in the quarterly magazine Alert! of the left-wing activist group Anti-Fascist Action (AFA). Kafka is funded by donations, rather than direct subsidies. Jaap van Beek is one of Kafka's spokespersons.

Groups investigated include New Right, the Nederlands Zuid-Afrikaanse Werkgemeenschap, the Unification Church, Voorpost, the Dutch People's Union and the Party for Freedom (PVV).

Research into the PVV
In February 2011, in the run-up to the Dutch provincial elections, the anti-fascist research group Kafka published a report in which it stated that various PVV candidate members and party supporters (who signed the “Declaration of support for a list of candidates”) had ties to the far-right. Among them were former Centre Democrats and members or candidate members of the Dutch People's Union.

AIVD
In the 2008 annual report of the General Intelligence and Security Service (AIVD), under the heading 'left-wing extremism', Kafka was also mentioned as information supplier of Anti-Fascist Action. In 2010, the AIVD wrote in its report Afkalvend Front that Kafka and AFA would strive to "keep everything that is considered right-wing out of the public space." Kafka and AFA would pursue this anti-democratic goal through undemocratic means, such as (inciting) violence and intimidation.

See also
 Blokwatch, a comparable research and documentation group on right-wing extremism in Belgium

References

External links 
 Official website

Anti-capitalism
Anti-fascism
Dutch political activists
Far-left politics
Political extremism in the Netherlands